The second election to the Merionethshire County Council was held in March 1892.  They were preceded by the 1889 election and followed by the 1895 election.

Overview of the result

The Liberals held their large majority with most seats being uncontested.

Unopposed Returns

At the inaugural election the majority of seats had been contested, and in many cases the majorities were very small. By 1892, however, most wards were uncontested.

Contested Elections

There were a large number of contested elections and the majorities were small in most instances. In most cases there were contests between Liberal and Conservative candidates.

The New Council

The first meeting of the council was held in Dolgellau.

Summary of Results

This section summarises the detailed results which are noted in the following sections. This was the inaugural county election and therefore no comparison can be made with the previous elections. One councillor was described as an Independent candidate but was also grouped in some reports with the Conservatives.

This table summarises the result of the elections in all wards. 42 councillors were elected.

|}

This table summarises the position following the election of aldermen. Eight were elected from among the elected members and eight from outside the council. This brought the total number of councillors and aldermen to 56.

|}

This table summarises the position following the by-elections for the three seats vacated following the election of aldermen. Technically these were new seats, taking the total number of councillors to 56. However, the Liberals defended three seats.

|}

Results

Aberdovey District
Enoch Lewis, Balkan Hill, standing as an Independent defeated William Jones, Sea View Terrace. The previous member sat as a Conservative.

Bala District

Barmouth Urban District

Bowydd (two seats)

Conglywal District

Corris

Corwen, Northern Division

Corwen, Southern Division

Cynfal and Teigl District (two seats)
William Davies, farmer, of Caerblaidd, Ffestiniog and John Hughes, farmer, of Hafodfawrisaf, Maentwrog, were elected at the expense of George Henry Ellis, solicitor, of Penymount, Ffestiniog and Edward Henry Jonathan, draper, of Paris House, Four Crosses.

Cwmorthin and Ystradau (two seats)

Dolgelley Northern

Dolgelley Southern

Dolgelley Rural District

Dyffryn
Samuel Pope, having been caught in the controversy over use of the Welsh language in 1889, did not seek re-election. John Davies, Glanymorfa, was elected in his place, defeating W. Ansell, Corsygedol.

Gwyddelwern

Harlech District
The sitting member, Richard Thomas Jones, surgeon, of Penygarth Villa, Harlech defeated F.R. Lloyd of Bronygraig by a much larger margin than his success in 1889.

Llanaber

Llandrillo

Llandderfel

Llanegryn

Llanfachreth

Llanfor
Richard John Price of Rhiwlas defeated William Thomas Rowlands, farmer, of Tanycoed, Llanfor (L).

Llanfrothen
John Jones, gentleman, of Ynysfor, Llanfrothen defeated William Hughes, farmer, of Cwmcaeth, Nantmor, Beddgelert.

Llansantffraid

Llanuwchllyn District

Llanycil

Llwyngwril

Maenofferen and Diphwys Combined District (two seats)
John Parry Jones of the District Bank, Blaenau Ffestiniog and Robert Owen Jones, solicitor, of High Street, Blaenau Ffestiniog were elected at the expense of Morris Jones, flour dealer, of Blaenbowydd House, Blaenau Ffestiniog.

Maentwrog
William Edward Oakeley of Plas Tanybwlch was elected unopposed.

Mawddwy District

Pennal

Penrhyn and Talsarnau (two seats)
J. B. Jones, miller, of Brynyfelin and John Rowe, quarry manager, of Glasfryn View, Penrhyn, were elected at the expense of Edmund Morgan Roberts, farmer, of Cefntrefor- isaf, Talsarnau and John Morgan, grocer, of Canton House, High Street, Blaenau Ffestiniog.

Rhiw (two seats)

Talyllyn

Teigl
Ellis Hughes, a quarryman, was returned unopposed.

Towyn Rural District

Towyn Urban District

Trawsfynydd Eastern and Western Districts (two seats)
John Humphreys, physician and surgeon, of Fronwynion-street, Trawsfynydd and Robert Hugh Pughe, farmer, of Brynllefrith, Trawsfynydd, were elected at the expense of David Tegid Jones, farmer, of Y Goppa and William Evans, draper, of Meirion House, Trawsfynydd.

Election of Aldermen

In addition to the 42 councillors the council consisted of 14 county aldermen. Aldermen were elected by the council, and served a six-year term. Following the election of the initial sixteen aldermen, half of the aldermanic bench would be  elected every three years following the triennial council election. After the initial elections, there were sixteen Aldermanic vacancies and the following Alderman were appointed by the newly elected council:

Only three of those elected were members of the council.

Elected for six years
S. Pope, Liberal, (elected councillor at  )
A. O. Williams, Liberal
J. Cadwaltwdr, Liberal 
Edward Griffith, Liberal (defeated candidate at Llanfachreth)
Richard Jones, Plasyracre, Liberal (elected councillor at Bala)
Wm. Williams, Liberal  
J. Hughes Jones, Liberal

Elected for three years

C. H. Wynn, Conservative
John Evans, Liberal 
E. H. Jonathan, Liberal
Andreas Roberts. Liberal
Edward Peters, Liberal (elected councillor at Llanycil)
Rev G. Ceidiog Roberts, Liberal (defeated candidate at Maentwrog)
William Davies, Pant, Liberal

Aldermanic Vacancies 1889-1895
Richard Jones died suddenly in February 1889, creating an immediate vacancy.

Therefore, the following appointment was made for the remaining six years in May 1892.

By-elections

Three by-elections were caused by the election of aldermen.

Bala by-election
Edward Watkin, land agent, Rhiwlas, standing as an Independent, defeated the Liberal candidate by fifteen votes. Richard Jones, who had been elected alderman, died three days later.

References

Bibliography
 

1892
1892 Welsh local elections